Bačkov is a village and municipality in the Trebišov District in the Košice Region of eastern Slovakia.

Geography
The village lies at an altitude of 198 metres and covers an area of 27.675 km².
It has a population of about 620 people.

Notable person
 The botanist and entomologist Imre Frivaldszky (1799-1870) was born in Bačkov (then Bacskó, Hungary).

Genealogical resources

The records for genealogical research are available at the state archive "Statny Archiv in Kosice, Slovakia"

 Roman Catholic church records (births/marriages/deaths): 1727–1895
 Greek Catholic church records (births/marriages/deaths): 1841–1880 (parish A)
 Lutheran church records (births/marriages/deaths): 1783–1895
 Reformated church records (births/marriages/deaths): 1749–1896
 Census records 1869 of Backov are available at the state archive.

See also
 List of municipalities and towns in Slovakia

External links
Surnames of living people in Backov

Villages and municipalities in Trebišov District
Zemplín (region)